Swann: A Mystery is a novel by Carol Shields that details the impact of an obscure Canadian poet, Mary Swann, upon four individuals: a feminist literary critic, the poet's biographer, a small-town librarian, and a crusty, brilliant newspaper editor. The book is divided into five sections, the first four each centering one of the characters, and the last detailing (in screenplay format) what happens when all congregate for a conference on Swann.

First published by Stoddart Publishing in 1987, the novel was inspired by the 1975 murder of Canadian poet Pat Lowther.

Film, TV or theatrical adaptations
The novel served as the basis of a 1996 feature film, Swann, directed by Anna Benson Gyles and starring Miranda Richardson, Brenda Fricker, Sean McCann, Michael Ontkean and John Neville. Written by David Young, it was nominated for five Genie Awards.

References

1987 American novels
Novels by Carol Shields
Novels about writers
Canadian novels adapted into films
1987 Canadian novels
American novels adapted into films
American novels adapted into television shows 
Canadian novels adapted into television shows